Gnadochaeta is a genus of bristle flies in the family Tachinidae. There are at least 30 described species in Gnadochaeta.

Species
These 30 species belong to the genus Gnadochaeta:

 Gnadochaeta antennalis (Aldrich, 1934) c g
 Gnadochaeta atra (Brauer & Bergenstamm, 1893) c
 Gnadochaeta australis (Townsend, 1916) c g
 Gnadochaeta clistoides (Townsend, 1891) i c g
 Gnadochaeta coerulea Macquart, 1851 c g
 Gnadochaeta crudelis (Wiedemann, 1830) i c g
 Gnadochaeta difficilis (Aldrich, 1934) c g
 Gnadochaeta flava (Coquillett, 1900) c
 Gnadochaeta fulvicornis (Zetterstedt, 1849) i c g
 Gnadochaeta globosa (Townsend, 1892) i c g
 Gnadochaeta harpi (Reinhard, 1974) i c g
 Gnadochaeta lasia (Reinhard, 1959) i c g
 Gnadochaeta madera (Townsend, 1915) c g
 Gnadochaeta madrensis (Townsend, 1915) c g
 Gnadochaeta mesensis (Townsend, 1915) i c g
 Gnadochaeta metallica (Townsend, 1891) i c g b
 Gnadochaeta morinioides (Townsend, 1919) i c g
 Gnadochaeta neomexicana (Townsend, 1915) i c g
 Gnadochaeta nigrifrons (Townsend, 1892) i c g b
 Gnadochaeta ochreicornis (Townsend, 1916) c g
 Gnadochaeta oregonensis (Townsend, 1915) i c g
 Gnadochaeta pollinosa (Curran, 1926) c
 Gnadochaeta pruinosa (Herting, 1973) c g
 Gnadochaeta puncticeps (Zetterstedt, 1859) i c g
 Gnadochaeta robusta (Coquillett, 1897) i c g
 Gnadochaeta ruficornis (Townsend, 1892) i c g
 Gnadochaeta setigera (Townsend, 1908) i c g
 Gnadochaeta sierricola (Townsend, 1917) c g
 Gnadochaeta sigilla (Reinhard, 1959) i c g
 Gnadochaeta solitaria (Aldrich, 1934) c g

Data sources: i = ITIS, c = Catalogue of Life, g = GBIF, b = Bugguide.net

References

Further reading

External links

 
 

Tachinidae
Brachycera genera